Diospyros tuberculata is a tree in the family Ebenaceae. Inflorescences bear up to five or more flowers. The specific epithet  is from the Latin meaning "wart-covered", possibly referring to the fruit. Its habitat is lowland mixed dipterocarp forests. D. tuberculata is endemic to Borneo.

References

tuberculata
Endemic flora of Borneo
Trees of Borneo
Plants described in 1933